The 2000–01 Israeli Hockey League season was the 10th season of Israel's hockey league. Five teams participated in the league, and HC Maccabi Amos Lod won the championship.

Regular season

Playoffs

Semifinals
 HC Ma’alot - HC Haifa 7:2
 HC Maccabi Amos Lod - HC Metulla 4:3

Final
 HC Ma’alot - HC Maccabi Amos Lod 1:2

External links 
 Season on hockeyarchives.info

Israeli League
Israeli League (ice hockey) seasons
Seasons